Jamal Jack (born December 17, 1987 in Trinidad and Tobago) is a Trinidadian footballer who last played for KFK Kópavogur in Icelandic fourth division. He plays primarily as a centre back or defensive midfielder.

Club career
Jamal Jack started his career in his native island of Tobago with Tobago United. In 2010, he moved to the main island of Trinidad to play with San Juan Jabloteh, and later on with St. Ann's Rangers and with Central. He also had a brief loan spell with Alpha United in 2014 to play 2014–15 CONCACAF Champions League against Portland Timbers and C.D. Olimpia.

In July 2016, Jack joined C.D. Dragon in El Salvador while also playing the 2016–17 CONCACAF Champions League against Saprissa and once again Portland Timbers. He was so spotted by Pittsburgh Riverhounds which he joined in January 2017, going on to play 28 matches for the USL side. In 2018, Jack moved to Colorado Springs Switchbacks where he made 50 appearances over two seasons. He was included in the Colorado Springs Switchbacks Best XI from the club's first five seasons.

In January 2020, he joined Jocoro F.C. in El Salvador.

In August 2020, he joined Sacachispas in Guatemala.

Style of play
Nicknamed "The Rock", due to his consistency, strength, and hard-tackling playing style, Jack stands out for his charismatic leadership and ability to organise his team's back-line and break down opposition plays. A quick, hard-working, tenacious, and powerful player, who excels in the air and at anticipating his opponents, he combines his aggression, stamina, and ability to read the game, as well as his physical, mental, and defensive skills, with a notable confidence and good technique on the ball, which also allowed him to play in the midfield throughout his career.

Personal life
Jack is born in Charlotteville, a village lying on the northeastern tip of Tobago. He is father of two children.

References

External links
 
 Caribbean Football Database profile

1987 births
Living people
Trinidad and Tobago footballers
TT Pro League players
Expatriate footballers in El Salvador
Pittsburgh Riverhounds SC players
Colorado Springs Switchbacks FC players
USL Championship players
Association football defenders
Trinidad and Tobago international footballers